The primordial tapecua (Tapecomys primus) is a species of medium-sized rodent in the family Cricetidae. The type locality is in southeastern Bolivia. It is the only known species of the genus Tapecomys. Two specimens were found in 1991 in a forested region at an elevation of 1500 m near the village of Tapecua in the Tarija Department of Bolivia. A few additional specimens have been found since, from the type locality and from a location in Jujuy Province, northern Argentina.

The holotype is held at the Museum of Southwestern Biology at the University of New Mexico MSB:Mamm:239826

References

Mammals of Argentina
Mammals of Bolivia
Phyllotini
Mammals described in 2000